Gmina Lubań is a rural gmina (administrative district) in Lubań County, Lower Silesian Voivodeship, in south-western Poland. Its seat is the town of Lubań, although the town is not part of the territory of the gmina.

Neighbouring gminas
Gmina Lubań is bordered by the town of Lubań and the gminas of Gryfów Śląski, Leśna, Nowogrodziec, Olszyna, Pieńsk, Platerówka, Siekierczyn, Sulików and Zgorzelec.

Villages
The gmina contains the villages of Henryków Lubański, Jałowiec, Kościelnik, Kościelniki Dolne, Mściszów, Nawojów Łużycki, Nawojów Śląski, Pisarzowice, Radogoszcz, Radostów Dolny, Radostów Górny, Radostów Średni and Uniegoszcz.

References

External links
Gmina website
Public Information Bulletin - Gmina Lubań
Lubanie website

Luban
Lubań County